Nototeredo is a genus of ship-worms, marine bivalve molluscs of the family Teredinidae.

Species in the genus Nototeredo
 Nototeredo edax (Hedley, 1895)   
 Nototeredo knoxi (Bartsch, 1917) – foliaceous shipworm, knox shipworm
 Nototeredo norvagica (Spengler, 1792) – Norway shipworm

References
 
 Powell A. W. B., New Zealand Mollusca, William Collins Publishers Ltd, Auckland, New Zealand 1979 

Teredinidae
Bivalve genera